Robin L. Grammer Jr. is an American politician serving as a state delegate in the Maryland House of Delegates for Maryland's 6th legislative district representing southeast Baltimore County. He is a lifelong resident of Maryland and a member of the Republican Party.

Early life and career
Grammer was born in Essex, Maryland on June 19, 1980, where he attended Eastern Technical High School. He graduated from the Community College of Baltimore County, earning an A.A. degree in computer science.

In the legislature
Grammer was sworn into the Maryland House of Delegates on January 14, 2015.

In June 2019, Grammer came under fire from other Baltimore County elected officials over social media comments towards members of the Baltimore County Public Schools Board of Education that contained racially-charged language. Grammer reiterated, saying that he meant to say that he does not "believe in cutting deals with criminals so that they can walk away without consequence to terrorize another school system" and that his comment had no reference to lynching.

Committee assignments
 Judiciary Committee, 2019–present (civil law & procedure subcommittee, 2019–present; criminal law & procedure subcommittee, 2019–present; law enforcement officers public information work group, 2019–present)
 House Cannabis Referendum and Legalization Work Group, 2021–present
 Marijuana Legalization Work Group, 2019
 Appropriations Committee, 2015–2018 (transportation & the environment subcommittee, 2015–2018; oversight committee on pensions, 2015–2018)

Political positions

Education
Grammer has introduced legislation during every legislative session since 2015 that would prohibit the Maryland State Department of Education from regulating the sale of coffee in relation to career exploration and development activities. The bill passed unanimously and became law during the 2016 legislative session.

Environment
During the 2020 legislative session, Grammer proposed amendments to legislation that would remove black liquor from the state's top renewable energy tier under the renewable energy portfolio standard that would delay the bill's effective date to 2023 and made black liquor a Tier 1 renewable energy source; both amendments were rejected by votes of 40-91 and 41-90.

Grammer introduced legislation during the 2022 legislative session that would prevent the Maryland Department of Natural Resources from dredging in the Man O'War Shoals, a prehistoric oyster reef containing as much as 100 million bushels of buried bivalve shell.

Immigration
Grammer opposed a bill introduced in the 2017 legislative session that would have made Maryland a sanctuary state. The legislature initially passed the bill in both chambers, but failed to override the governor's veto. Grammer also opposed an executive order signed by Baltimore County executive Kevin Kamenetz that formalized police policy on undocumented immigrants in Baltimore County.

Marijuana
Grammer is a member of the House Cannabis Referendum and Legalization Work Group and the Marijuana Legalization Work Group. In 2015, Grammer voted alongside six other Republicans for a bill that would decriminalize the possession of marijuana paraphernalia. During the 2020 legislative session, Grammer cosponsored legislation that would medical marijuana to be administered at schools. Grammer does not support preventing medical marijuana patients from owning guns, saying that it limits their job opportunities and sporting activities.

Policing
During the 2021 legislative session, Grammer introduced legislation that would have banned no-knock warrants. Grammer opposed the Police Reform and Accountability Act of 2021, saying that it would put police across the state in an "impossible position."

Electoral history

References

Living people
1980 births
Republican Party members of the Maryland House of Delegates
21st-century American politicians